Sulo Parkkinen (21 April 1930 – 2013) was a Finnish footballer. He played in two matches for the Finland national football team from 1953 to 1955. He was also part of Finland's team at the 1952 Summer Olympics, and for their qualification matches for the 1954 FIFA World Cup.

References

External links
 

1930 births
2013 deaths
Finnish footballers
Finland international footballers
Place of birth missing
Association football defenders